Lilium bakerianum is a species of lily plant described by Collett Hemsley and William Botting Hemsley.

The species is named in honor of botanist John Gilbert Baker.

Subspecies
The species is divided into the following subspecies:

 Lilium bakerianum subsp. aureum
 Lilium bakerianum subsp. bakerianum
 Lilium bakerianum subsp. delavayi
 Lilium bakerianum subsp. rubrum
 Lilium bakerianum subsp. yunnanense

References

bakerianum